was a village located in Chiisagata District, Nagano Prefecture, Japan.

As of 2003, the village had an estimated population of 2,505 and a density of 28.53 persons per km². The total area was 87.81 km².

On October 1, 2005, Wada, along with the town of Nagato (also from Chiisagata District), was merged to create the town of Nagawa.

External links
Official website of Nagawa 

Dissolved municipalities of Nagano Prefecture
Nagawa, Nagano